Thelytoky (from the Greek thēlys "female" and tokos "birth") is  a type of parthenogenesis in which females are produced from unfertilized eggs, as for example in aphids. Thelytokous parthenogenesis is rare among animals and reported in about 1,500 species, about 1 in 1000 of described animal species, according to a 1984 study. It is more common in invertebrates, like arthropods, but it can occur in vertebrates, including salamanders, fish, and reptiles such as some whiptail lizards.

Thelytoky can occur by different mechanisms, each of which has a different impact on the level of homozygosity. It is found in several groups of Hymenoptera, including Apidae, Aphelinidae, Cynipidae, Formicidae, Ichneumonidae, and Tenthredinidae. It can be induced in Hymenoptera by the bacteria Wolbachia and Cardinium.

Arrhenotoky and thelytoky in Hymenoptera 

Hymenoptera (ants, bees, wasps, and sawflies) have a haplodiploid sex-determination system. They produce haploid males from unfertilized eggs (arrhenotoky), a form of parthenogenesis. However, in a few social hymenopterans, queens or workers are capable of producing diploid female offspring by thelytoky. The daughters produced may or may not be complete clones of their mother depending on the type of parthenogenesis that takes place. The offspring can develop into either queens or workers. Examples of such species include the Cape bee, Apis mellifera capensis,  Mycocepurus smithii and clonal raider ant, Ooceraea biroi.

Automixis

Automixis is a form of thelytoky. In automictic parthenogenesis, meiosis takes place and diploidy is restored by fusion of first division non-sister nuclei (central fusion) or the second division sister nuclei (terminal fusion). (see diagram).

With central fusion

Automixis with central fusion tends to maintain heterozygosity in the passage of the genome from mother to daughter.  This form of automixis has been observed in several ant species including the desert ant Cataglyphis cursor, the clonal raider ant Cerapachys biroi, the predaceous ant Platythyrea punctata, and the electric ant (little fire ant) Wasmannia auropunctata.  Automixis with central fusion also occurs in the Cape honey bee Apis mellifera capensis, the brine shrimp Artemia parthenogenetica, and the termite Embiratermes neotenicus.

Oocytes that undergo automixis with central fusion often display a reduced rate of crossover recombination.  A low rate of recombination in automictic oocytes favors maintenance of heterozygosity, and only a slow transition from heterozygosity to homozygosity over successive generations.  This allows avoidance of immediate inbreeding depression.  Species that display central fusion with reduced recombination include the ants P. punctata and W. auropunctata, the brine shrimp A. parthenogenetica, and the honey bee A. m. capensis.  In A. m. capensis, the recombination rate during the meiosis associated with thelytokous parthenogenesis is reduced by more than 10-fold.  In W. auropunctata the reduction is 45-fold.

Single queen colonies of the narrow headed ant Formica exsecta provide an illustrative example of the possible deleterious effects of increased homozygosity.  In this ant the level of queen homozygosity is negatively associated with colony age. Reduced colony survival appears to be due to decreased queen lifespan resulting from queen homozygosity and expression of deleterious recessive mutations (inbreeding depression).

With terminal fusion

Automixis with terminal fusion tends to promote homozygosity in the passage of the genome from mother to daughter.  This form of automixis has been observed in the water flea Daphnia magna and the Colombian rainbow boa constrictor Epicrates maurus.  Parthenogenesis in E. maurus is only the third genetically confirmed case of consecutive virgin births of viable offspring from a single female within any vertebrate lineage.  However, survival of offspring over two successive litters was poor, suggesting that automixis with terminal fusion leads to homozygosity and expression of deleterious recessive alleles (inbreeding depression).

See also 

 Autotoky
 Epitoky
 Arrhenotoky

References 

Beekeeping
Insect reproduction
Asexual reproduction